Xu Yuanquan (徐源泉; Hsü Yüan-ch'üan; c. 1885–1960) was a Kuomintang general. He was born in Huanggang, Hubei. An eyewitness to the Wuchang Uprising, he was a subordinate of Zhang Zongchang before joining the Kuomintang. He was commander of the 48th Division of the Nationalist forces in 1930. In 1933 he was commanding the Tenth Army, stationed in Changsha, and he was involved in the opium trade.

References

Biography

1880s births
1960 deaths
National Revolutionary Army generals from Hubei
Opium
People of the Second Sino-Japanese War
People from Huanggang
Members of the 1st Legislative Yuan
Members of the 1st Legislative Yuan in Taiwan